Bowling is an unincorporated community in Cumberland County, Tennessee, in the United States.

The community was named for Rodney Bowling, a pioneer settler.

References

Unincorporated communities in Cumberland County, Tennessee
Unincorporated communities in Tennessee